Adrian Ronan (born 8 June 1970) is an Irish retired hurler who played as a full-forward for the Kilkenny senior team.

Born in Ballycallan, County Kilkenny, Ronan first played competitive hurling during his schooling at St. Kieran's College. He arrived on the inter-county scene at the age of seventeen when he first lined up with the Kilkenny minor team before later joining the under-21 side. He made his senior debut during the 1988-89 league. Ronan went on to become a regular member of the starting fifteen and won two All-Ireland medals, three Leinster medal and one National Hurling League medal. He was an All-Ireland runner-up on one occasion.

As a member of the Leinster inter-provincial team on a number of occasions, Ronan won one Railway Cup medal. At club level he is a one-time Leinster medallist with Graigue–Ballycallan.

Following his retirement from hurling Ronan immediately became involved in team management.  He enjoyed a hugely successful tenure as manager of the Danesfort club side for four years. Ronan was appointed manager of the Kilkenny minor hurling team in November 2010.

References 

1970 births
Living people
Graigue-Ballycallan hurlers
Kilkenny inter-county hurlers
All-Ireland Senior Hurling Championship winners
Hurling managers